Tone Heimlund (born 24 May 1985) is a Norwegian retired football midfielder who played for Fløya and the Norwegian national team.

Club career

Heimlund had a breakout season with Fløya scoring 18 goals in the Toppserien in 2005. A serious knee injury ended Heimlund's promising career in 2007.  Heimlund took up competitive cross-country skiing  as an alternative in 2009 in order to still  compete in sports.

International career

Youth

Heimlund also participated at the 2003 UEFA Women's Under-19 Championship. Heimlund efforts helped Norway reach the final ultimately losing to France.

Senior

Heimlund was selected as part of the Norwegian squad at the 2005 European Championships.

References 

1985 births
Living people
Norwegian women's footballers
Norway women's youth international footballers
Women's association football midfielders
Women's association football forwards
Toppserien players
IF Fløya players